Basu (variants: Bose, Boshu, Bosu, Bosh) is an Indian surname, primarily found among Bengali Hindus. It stems from Sanskrit वासु vāsu (a name of Vishṇu meaning 'dwelling in all beings').

History 
Basus belong to the Kayastha caste in Bengal. They evolved as a caste from a category of officials or scribes, between the 5th/6th century CE and 11th/12th century CE, its component elements being putative Kshatriyas and mostly Brahmins, according to André Wink. Basus are considered as Kulin Kayasthas of Gautam gotra, along with Ghoshes and Mitras.

Notable people 
 Amrita Basu, (b. 1953) American scholar
 Amar Bose, (1929 – 2013) Founder and chairman of Bose Corporation which make Bose home audio products. Indian American entrepreneur and academic. Professor at the Massachusetts Institute of Technology (MIT). 
 Bani Basu, (b. 1939), Bengali Indian author, essayist, critic, and poet
 Benoy Basu, (1908-1930), Indian revolutionary and freedom fighter
 Bipasha Basu, Bollywood actress and model
 Buddhadeb Bosu, (1908–1974), Bengali writer
 Chandranath Basu, (1844-1910), Bengali conservative litterateur
 Debabrata Basu, (1924 - 2001) Indian statistician who proved Basu's theorem
 Durga Das Basu, (1910 - 1997), Indian jurist and lawyer who wrote the Commentary on the Constitution of India and Casebook on the Indian Constitutional Law
 Jagadish Chandra Bose, (1858 - 1937),  Biologist, physicist, botanist and an early writer of science fiction. One of the fathers of radio science, inventor of  crescograph, founder of Bose Institute.
 Jyoti Basu, (1914-2010), founding member of the Communist Party of India (Marxist) . Barrister, longest serving chief minister of West Bengal.
 Jyotirmoy Basu, (1920-1982), Indian politician for CPM party . 
 Kaushik Basu, (b. 1952), Indian economist
 Khudiram Bose, (1889-1908), Indian Freedom Fighter
 Kunal Basu, author of the novel Racists
 Maladhar Basu, a poet of the Hossain-Shahi period in Bengal history, writer of Sri Krishna Vijaya (শ্রীকৃষ্ণবিজয়, Triumph of Lord Krishna)
 Neil Basu (b. 1968), senior British police officer.
 Nagendranath Basu (1866-1938), encyclopedia compiler, archaeologist, and historian 
 Nandalal Bose, seminal painter and sculptor
 Nandita Basu, Indian-born American environmental engineer
 Pam Basu (19581992), victim of carjacking and murder
 Rajnarayan Basu, (1826-1899), writer and intellectual of the Bengal Renaissance
 Rash Behari Bose, (1886 – 1945), Indian revolutionary leader, founded the First Indian National Army
 Samaresh Basu, writer; winner of the 1980 Sahitya Akademi Award
 Samit Basu, (b. 1979), Indian author
 Satyendra Nath Bose, (1894 – 1974), Indian mathematician and physicist. Best known for his work on quantum mechanics, Bose–Einstein statistics and Bose–Einstein condensate. Elementary particles Bosons were named after him. 
 Satyendranath Bosu, (1882-1908), Indian revolutionary and freedom fighter
 Sekhar Basu, (1952-2020), Indian nuclear scientist who served as the chairman of the Atomic Energy Commission, Awarded the Padma Shri in 2014
Siddhartha Basu, Indian television producer-director and quiz show host
 Sreyashi Jhumki Basu, (1977-2008) American science educator
 Subhas Chandra Bose, (1897-1945), Indian nationalist leader

See also
 Jyoti Basu (disambiguation)

References 

Surnames
Bengali Hindu surnames
Indian surnames
Kayastha